Kitsap Color Classic, a Cascade Bicycle Club event, is an annual event held every Autumn on the Kitsap Peninsula of Washington State since its beginning in 1991. Bicyclists board a Washington State Ferry in Edmonds, Washington, then ride to Kingston to start cycling. Distances range from 25 miles to 57 miles.

External links 
 Kitsap Color Classic official website

Cycling in Washington (state)